Sugimura is a Japanese surname. Notable people with the surname include:

Haruko Sugimura, Japanese actress 
Sugimura Jihei (1681–1703), Japanese printmaker 
Kenji Sugimura,  Japanese architect and patent attorney
Noboru Sugimura, Japanese writer
Nobuchika Sugimura, Japanese patent attorney
Shojiro Sugimura, Japanese footballer 
Shunzo Sugimura, Japanese medical researcher and writer 
Taizō Sugimura
Tsune Sugimura, Japanese photographer 
Yoko Sugimura, Japanese pin-up model

See also
Sugimura & Partners, a Japanese law firm 

Japanese-language surnames